Constantine the Philosopher may refer to:

 Cyril, born Constantine, of Saints Cyril and Methodius, 9th-century Byzantine scholar born in Thessaloniki
 Constantine of Nicaea, 12th-century Byzantine philosopher
 Constantine of Kostenets (died after 1431), Bulgarian historian and biographer of Stefan Lazarević

ru:Константин Философ